Sabino Tirado (born 29 August 1910, date of death unknown) was a Mexican boxer. He competed in the men's bantamweight event at the 1932 Summer Olympics.

References

External links
 

1910 births
Year of death missing
Mexican male boxers
Olympic boxers of Mexico
Boxers at the 1932 Summer Olympics
Place of birth missing
Bantamweight boxers